This is a list of U.S. states, the District of Columbia and territories by median age in 2020. The median age is the index that divides the entire population into two numerically equal age groups, one younger than that age and the other older than that age. It is the only index associated with the age distribution of a population.

See also 
Demography of the United States
List of countries by median age

Notes

References 

median age
United States demography-related lists
United States, median age